Phyllocnistis triploca is a moth of the family Gracillariidae, known from Bihar, India. The hostplant for the species is an unidentified species of  Loranthus.

References

Phyllocnistis
Endemic fauna of India
Moths of Asia